Juan Carlos Fonda (born 15 October 1919 date of death  5  April 2004) was an Argentine footballer. He played in ten matches for the Argentina national football team in 1945 and 1946. He was also part of Argentina's squad for the 1946 South American Championship.

References

External links
 
 

1919 births
Year of death missing
Argentine footballers
Argentina international footballers
Place of birth missing
Association football defenders
Club Atlético Platense footballers
Racing Club de Avellaneda footballers
Argentine football managers
Rosario Central managers